Passalozetidae is a family of mites belonging to the order Sarcoptiformes.

Genera:
 Bipassalozetes Mihelcic, 1957
 Passalobates Perez-Inigo & Pena, 1996
 Passalomonia Mahunka, 1987
 Passalozetes Grandjean, 1932

References

Sarcoptiformes